Amphirhagatherium is an extinct genus of artiodactyl that lived in northern Europe during the middle to late Eocene.

The dentition of Amphirhagatherium suggests that the genus had a mixed diet of leaves and fruits likely eaten at ground level. Caniniform anterior teeth suggest that there may have been a small carnivorous dietary component, or were used for intraspecific combat.

Distribution 
Eocene
 Creechbarrow Limestone, Upper Headon Beds and Bembridge Marls Formations, England
 Rocourt-Saint-Martin and Chéry-Chartreuve, France
 Frohnstetten, Germany

Oligocene
 Bembridge Marls, England

References 

Eocene mammals of Europe
Oligocene mammals of Europe
Paleogene England
Fossils of England
Paleogene France
Fossils of France
Paleogene Germany
Fossils of Germany
Fossil taxa described in 1908
Taxa named by Charles Depéret
Prehistoric even-toed ungulate genera